Russian Sky Airlines was an airline with its head office on the grounds of Domodedovo International Airport in Moscow, Russia. Its main base was Domodedovo International Airport. In late 2014 the airline announced it was filing for bankruptcy, and its license was revoked by Russian aviation authorities on 24.12.2014.

History

The airline was established on November 27, 1995 as East Line Air, that later on February 8, 1996 was granted Certificate No 61 by the civil aviation authorities of Russia. This Certificate had entitled the airline to operate all types of domestic civil  aircraft. From January 3, 1996, East Line Air became a member of IATA. In 1997 the airline was renamed East Line Airlines, and a new Operator’s Certificate, retaining the same number, was approved on 4 September 1997, and subsequently renewed in compliance with the Federal Aviation Authorities regulations. East Line Airlines was a part of East Line group, which owns Domodedovo airport. They also were one of the leading cargo carriers in Russia.

In May 2004 a change of shareholders of East Line Airlines took place. The Extraordinary Meeting of Shareholders of East Line Airlines, held on June 7, 2004, resolved to delegate the authority of a sole executive body to a Managing Organization — Russian Sky Aviation Group, and on  October 21, 2004 East Line Airlines was renamed Russian Sky Airlines without any change of the legal entity.

In 2005 the airline was acquired by VIM Airlines.

Fleet
As of August 2006, the Russian Sky Airlines fleet included:

4 Ilyushin Il-76TD
1 Tupolev Tu-154M (leased from Bural, then to S7 Airlines)

Previously operated
As of January 2005 Russian Sky Airlines operated:

2 Antonov An-12
1 Ilyushin Il-62M
1 Ilyushin Il-76T
3 Ilyushin Il-86
1 Tupolev Tu-134A
1 Tupolev Tu-154B2
1 Yakovlev Yak-42

References

External links

East Line Group (Archives) 
Vim Airlines 
Russian Sky Airlines aircraft

Defunct airlines of Russia
Companies based in Moscow
Airlines established in 1995
Airlines disestablished in 2005
1995 establishments in Russia
2005 disestablishments in Russia